Rosemary Banks (born 1951) is a New Zealand diplomat who served as the Ambassador of New Zealand to the United States between 2018 and 2022. She is the first woman to hold the position.

Education 
Banks graduated with an MA in Russian from the University of Canterbury, and received an MSc from the London School of Economics. She was awarded an honorary doctorate of literature by the University of Canterbury in April 2015.

Career 
Banks served as New Zealand deputy high commissioner to the Solomon Islands between 1985 and 1987, and to Australia from 1992 until 1995.

As Deputy Secretary in New Zealand's Ministry of Foreign Affairs and Trade, Banks spearheaded the development of a new emergency response system, following the September 11 attacks in 2001, the 2002 Bali bombings, and the 2004 Boxing Day tsunami.

She was New Zealand's Permanent Representative to the United Nations in New York from June 2005 to June 2009, and Ambassador to France and Permanent Representative to the OECD from 2010 to 2014. In 2018, Banks succeeded Tim Groser as New Zealand ambassador to the United States.

Banks has also served as a Crown negotiator for the Treaty of Waitangi settlement process.

References

External links

New Zealand Mission to the United Nations

1951 births
Living people
Alumni of the London School of Economics
Ambassadors of New Zealand to France
Ambassadors of New Zealand to the United States
New Zealand women ambassadors
Permanent Representatives of New Zealand to the United Nations
University of Canterbury alumni